The following is a list of all the video games based on the sport of Australian rules football.

Simulation Games
Games in which the player can play a full game of Australian rules football, or other arcade-style games with official licenses.

Management Games
The following games allow the player to manage a team without actually playing the game.

See also

 Australian rules football
 List of rugby union video games

References

External links

 
Video games
Australian rules football
Video games set in Australia